Tatarstan Airlines Flight 363 was a scheduled domestic passenger flight, operated by Tatarstan Airlines on behalf of Ak Bars Aero, from Moscow to Kazan, Russia. On 17 November 2013, at  local time (UTC+4), the Boeing 737-500 crashed during an aborted landing at Kazan International Airport, killing all 44 passengers and 6 crew members on board, making it 2013's worst plane crash.

According to the official investigation report by the Interstate Aviation Committee (IAC), the crash was a result of pilot error, arising from a lack of skill to recover from an excessive nose-up attitude during a go-around procedure. The pilots' deficiencies were caused by a problem with the airline's safety management and a lack of regulatory oversight. One member of the commission filed an alternative opinion report, however, claiming that the commission had ignored the possible malfunction of the aircraft's elevator controls.

Accident

While on final approach to Kazan International Airport, the crew initiated a go-around due to an unstable approach but crashed onto the runway in a 75-degree-nose-down attitude, at a speed of  moments later and exploded upon impact with the ground. A second explosion occurred 40 seconds after impact.  One of the airport's surveillance cameras caught the crash on video. All 44 passengers and 6 crew members were killed; there were no casualties on the ground. High winds and cloudy conditions were reported at the airport at the time of the crash.

The Kazan International Airport was kept closed for about 24 hours, serving only transit flights, before it was fully reopened on 18 November.

Aircraft
The Boeing 737-53A, registration number VQ-BBN, had been in service for more than 23 years. It had been operated by seven airlines. Owned by AWAS from its manufacture (Boeing customer code 3A represents AWAS), it was leased to Euralair (1990 to 1992, registered F-GGML), Air France (1992 to 1995, still as F-GGML), Uganda Airlines (1995 to 1999, registered 5X-USM), Rio Sul (2000 to 2005, registered PT-SSI), Blue Air (2005 to 2008, registered YR-BAB), Bulgaria Air (several months in 2008, registered LZ-BOY), and Tatarstan Airlines (late 2008 until it crashed).

The airframe had been involved in two prior incidents: 
 While in service with Rio Sul, on 17 December 2001, the aircraft crashed about  short of the runway while landing at Tancredo Neves International Airport under adverse weather conditions, damaging its landing gear. All 108 passengers and crew on board survived.
 On 26 November 2012, the aircraft made an emergency landing in Kazan due to problems with cabin depressurization shortly after takeoff.

Crew 
The captain was 47-year-old Rustem Gabdrakhmanovich Salikhov, who had been with the airline since 1992. He had 2,755 flight hours, including 2,509 hours on the Boeing 737. The first officer was Viktor Nikiforovich Gutsul, who was also 47. He had been with the airline since 2008 and had 2,093 flight hours, with 1,943 of them on the Boeing 737.

Victims 

The full list of the passengers and crew was published by the Ministry of Emergency Situations. One of the victims was Irek Minnikhanov, the son of the incumbent President of the Republic of Tatarstan, Rustam Minnikhanov.

Investigation 

The IAC launched an investigation into the crash and arrived at the site on 18 November. Both flight recorders, the flight data recorder (FDR) and the cockpit voice recorder (CVR), were recovered from the wreckage. The Tatarstan Transport Prosecution Office has opened a criminal investigation into the crash. The American National Transportation Safety Board (NTSB) dispatched a team of investigators to the crash site.

On 19 November, Aksan Giniyatullin, the director of Tatarstan Airlines, declared that although the cockpit crew was experienced, the captain of the airliner may have lacked experience performing a go-around maneuver. Moments before the crash the pilot informed the control tower that the aircraft was not properly configured for landing and initiated a go-around, before plunging into the ground as if it had stalled. Investigators said the possible causes of the accident included technical malfunction as well as pilot error.

On 22 November, the British Air Accidents Investigation Branch (AAIB) announced they had joined the investigation and had dispatched investigators to Kazan.

Official reports 

According to the criminal case report, released 14 November 2019 by the Investigative Committee of Russia, the investigation determined that crash was a direct result of erroneous actions on the part of the captain (Salikhov) and the first officer (Gutsul). Based on information obtained during the investigation, Salikhov was lacking sufficient piloting skills and was granted piloting on a basis of falsified documents.

On 19 November 2013, the Investigation Board of the IAC reported the following preliminary details after recovering some information from the flight data recorder:

Tatarstan Airlines Boeing 737-500 Accident Technical Investigation Board of IAC informs about preliminary results of flight data recorder information recovery.

During the final approach, the flight crew were unable to follow a standard landing pattern defined by the regulating documentation. Having realized the aircraft was not lined-up properly relative to the runway, the crew reported to the ATC and started to go-around using the TOGA (take off / go around) mode. One of the two autopilots, which was active during the final approach, had been switched off and the flight was being controlled manually.

The engines reached thrust level close to full. The crew retracted the flaps from 30 degrees to 15 degrees position.

Affected by the upturn moment generated by the engine thrust, the aircraft started to climb, reaching the pitch angle of about 25 degrees. Indicated airspeed started to decrease. The crew retracted the landing gear. Since initiating the go-around maneuver up to this moment, the crew did not perform control actions through the yoke.

Maximum angles of attack have not exceeded operational limits during the flight.

The aircraft collided with terrain at high speed (exceeding ) and with highly negative pitch angle.

About 45 seconds have passed between the moment of starting go-around maneuver and the moment the recording stopped, the descent took about 20 seconds.

The propulsion systems were operating up to the collision with terrain. No single commands have been detected by the preliminary analysis, which would indicate failures of systems or units of the aircraft or engines.

Final report 
On 24 December 2015, the IAC released their final report stating that the crash was caused by an under-qualified crew who lacked the skills to recover from an excessive nose up attitude during a go-around procedure.  The go-around was necessitated by a positional error in the navigation system, a map drift. The pilots' deficiencies were caused by lack of airline safety management and lack of regulators' oversight.

According to the final report, during the final approach the crew initiated a go-around, but being under high workload, which possibly caused a "tunnel vision effect", they did not perceive warning messages related to auto-pilot disconnection. When the plane climbed to 700 m, its pitch angle reached 25 degrees and the airspeed dropped to 230 km/h. At that moment the captain, who had not performed a go-around outside of training, moved the yoke, pitching nose down, which led to stopping climb and started a descent and increase of the aircraft's airspeed. After reaching the altitude of 700 m, the aircraft started a steep nosedive, with the pitch angle reaching −75° when the aircraft impacted the ground. The plane crashed on the airport's runway with a speed exceeding 450 km/h. The time from the start of the go-around maneuver until the impact was about 45 seconds, including 20 seconds of aircraft descent.

Alternative opinion report 

Nikolay Studenikin, the official representative of the Rosaviatsiya in the air accident investigation commission, filed an alternative opinion report, in which he expressed his disagreement with the conclusions of the commission.

In it he stated that the IAC commission concentrated the investigation on the search of the shortcomings in the flight crew training in Russia, and that no direct connection between such shortcomings and the Flight 363 crash was actually established. He also criticized, that the investigation into the possible malfunction of the aircraft's elevators' controls was entrusted to their manufacturer, the US-based Parker Aerospace, which ruled that their controls operated normally during the accident. According to Studenikin, a flight simulation of the crashed flight, which was conducted on the Boeing facilities, was aimed only on proving the crew's fault and didn't simulate a possible mechanical failure in the Boeing aircraft.

Aircraft certificate suspension 

Rosaviatsiya refused to accept the results of the IAC's Flight 363 accident investigation, citing their concern over the Boeing 737's elevators' controls. IAC suggested that the position by Rosaviatsiya was caused by their reluctance to accept the shortcomings of Rosaviatsiya's regulatory oversight of pilot training in Russia, which was revealed in the report. On 4 November 2015, IAC unexpectedly announced the suspension of Boeing 737 flying certificates in Russia, explaining it by Rosaviatsiya's refusal to accept the absence of safety issues with 737 elevator controls.

With the Boeing 737 being a work-horse of several Russian airlines, the suspension meant that within days the significant part of the country's passenger fleet could be grounded for an uncertain period of time. Dmitry Peskov, a spokesman for the Russian President, said that Kremlin was aware of the IAC decision to suspend Boeing 737 operation in Russia and believed that the specialized agencies and the Cabinet would make the necessary analysis of the situation. Ministry of Transport said that only six out of 150 Boeing 737 aircraft in Russia have the certificates issued by IAC, the rest got their certificates in other countries and thus IAC has no right to suspend them. Rosaviatsiya announced that the IAC had no right to ban any Boeing 737 operation in Russia, as such a decision could be made only by the federal executive bodies. It called an emergency meeting to discuss the future of Boeing 737 in Russia with the participation of Ministry of Transport, Rostransnadzor, airline representatives and a Boeing representative in Russia, but IAC refused to attend it. The next day the IAC withdrew its suspension of Boeing 737 certificates.

On 10 December 2015, the IAC met and officially accepted its Flight 363 final accident investigation report. Rosaviatsiya and Studenikin refused to participate in this meeting or provide their approval for the report.

Aftermath
In early , Russia's Federal Air Transport Agency recommended that the airline's certificate should be revoked. The revocation was announced on 31 December 2013, and the company's aircraft were transferred to Ak Bars Aero.

See also
 Flydubai Flight 981 – a Boeing 737 crashed in similar circumstances in 2016
Aeroflot Flight 821 – Another 737-500 that also crashed in similar circumstances in 2008

References

External links
Interstate Aviation Committee
Official profile of the air crash investigation
Final report of the air crash investigation by IAC
Official profile of the air crash investigation  – the Russian version is the report of record.
Final report of the air crash investigation by IAC 
 Alternative opinion report by the Rosaviatsiya representative in the air crash investigation commission 

Flight Manifest (Archive) , 17 November 2013.

2013 disasters in Russia
Accidents and incidents involving the Boeing 737 Classic
Airliner accidents and incidents caused by pilot error
Aviation accidents and incidents in 2013
Aviation accidents and incidents in Russia
November 2013 events in Russia
21st century in Kazan